The Great Gay Road is a novel by the British writer Tom Gallon first published in 1910. It inspired the 1918 play The Call of the Road by Mrs George Norman.

Film adaptations
The novel has twice been adapted into films. A 1920 silent version The Great Gay Road and a 1931 sound film The Great Gay Road.

References

Bibliography
 Nicoll, Alardyce. English Drama, 1900-1930: The Beginnings of the Modern Period. Part I. Cambridge University Press, 1973.

1910 British novels
British novels adapted into films
Novels by Tom Gallon